Hall of the Mountain King is the fourth studio album by the American heavy metal band Savatage, released in 1987 under the direction of producer Paul O'Neill. It is their first album produced by O'Neill, who was assigned to the band after the tour in support of Fight for the Rock. O'Neill's influence pushed Savatage to adopt a conceptual progressive metal style beginning with this album.

"Prelude to Madness" is an arrangement of Grieg's "In the Hall of the Mountain King" from the Peer Gynt suite. Oddly, Grieg is not credited for this song, but for the following title track - which is an original song. The intro of "Prelude to Madness" features keyboards and guitar playing "Mars, the Bringer of War" from Gustav Holst's suite, The Planets. The song would be re-recorded by Trans-Siberian Orchestra in 2009 under the title of "The Mountain", appearing on that group's fifth studio album, Night Castle.

"This Is Where You Should Be", recorded during the studio sessions for this album, was not included; years later it was released on compilations and album reissues.

This was the first album to feature the album cover drawn by artist Gary Smith, who was responsible for lead guitarist Criss Oliva's airbrushed guitars at the time. Hall of the Mountain King reached position No. 116 in the US Billboard 200 albums chart.

In 2017 and 2019, respectively, Loudwire and Metal Hammer ranked it as the 22nd and 8th best power metal album of all time.

Track listing

Personnel
In the liner notes for the album, the band gave themselves roles instead of listing their instruments.

Savatage
Jon Oliva – "The Grit" (lead vocals, piano)
Criss Oliva – "The Crunch" (guitars)
Johnny Lee Middleton – "The Thunder" (bass guitar, backing vocals)
Steve Wacholz – "Doctor Killdrums" (drums, percussion)

Additional musicians
Robert Kinkel – keyboards
Ray Gillen – backing vocals on "Strange Wings"
Chris Caffery – guitars (touring member only)

Production
Paul O'Neill – producer, arrangements 
Savatage – co-producer, arrangements
Roy Cicala, Nick Schiralli – recording, mixing at Record Plant, New York
James A. Ball – engineer
Joe Henahan – assistant engineer
Jack Skinner – mastering at Sterling Sound, New York
Gary Smith – Illustration
Savatage, Bob Defrin – art direction
Robert Zemsky – direction 
R. Z. management Inc. – management

Charts

References

External links
Track by track review 

1987 albums
Savatage albums
Atlantic Records albums
Albums produced by Paul O'Neill (rock producer)